The following is a discography of songs, recorded by various artists, that Robin Thicke has been credited for as a songwriter and producer.

1994

Brandy - Brandy 
 12. "Love Is On My Side" (written with Damon Thomas; backing vocals)

1995

3T - Brotherhood 
 06. "Sexual Attention" (written with Damon Thomas)

Brian McKnight - I Remember You 
 05. "Anyway" (written with Brian McKnight)

1996

Color Me Badd - Now and Forever 
 01. "Sexual Capacity" (as Rob Thicke, written with Christopher A. Stewart, and Sean K. Hall; produced with Sean "Sep" Hall)

1997

Brownstone - Still Climbing 
 08. "Around You" (writer; produced with Gerry Brown; backing vocals)

98 Degrees - 98 Degrees 
 12. "Don't Stop the Love" (written with Christopher A. Stewart, Sean K. Hall)

Sam Salter - It's On Tonight 
 08. "Every Time A Car Drives By" (written with Phillip L. Stewart II)

1999

Jordan Knight - Jordan Knight 
 01. "Give It to You" (written with James Harris III, Terry Lewis, Jordan Knight)
 02. "A Different Party" (written with James Harris III, Terry Lewis, Jordan Knight)
 03. "Change My Ways" (written with Bobby B. Keyes; Produced with Pro J & Jordan Knight)
 04. "I Could Never Take the Place of Your Man" (Produced with Jordan Knight)
 05. "Finally Finding Out" (written with Bobby B. Keyes, Armand Sabal-Lecco, and Jordan Knight; Produced with Jordan Knight)
 07. "Don't Run" (written with Jordan Knight; Produced with Donnie Wahlberg and Jordan Knight)
 08. "Separate Ways" (written with Alan Thicke, and Brennan Thicke; Produced with Jordan Knight)
 09. "Close My Eyes" (written with James Harris III, Terry Lewis, Jordan Knight)
 12. "Can I Come Over Tonight" (writer; Produced with Jordan Knight)

Christina Aguilera - Christina Aguilera 
 09. "When You Put Your Hands on Me" (written with James Gass a.k.a. Pro J; Produced with Pro J)

Chante Moore - This Moment Is Mine 
 13. "In My Life" (written with Lascelles Stephens; producer)

Marc Anthony - Marc Anthony 
 01. "When I Dream at Night" (written with Dan Shea)

Kevon Edmonds - 24/7 
 05. "How Often" (written with Babyface, and Walter Afanasieff)

2000

P!nk - Can't Take Me Home 
 06. "Let Me Let You Know" (written with Neal Creque, Sean Hall, and Christopher Stewart)

Mýa - Fear of Flying 
 10. "Takin' Me Over" (feat. Left Eye) (written with Mýa Harrison, Pro J, Lisa "Left Eye" Lopes, and Robert Daniels; produced with Pro J)
 11. "Now or Never" (written with B.B. Keyes, Pro J (James Gass), and Robert Daniels; produced with Pro J)
 15. "No Tears on My Pillow" (written with Mýa Harrison; produced with Pro J)

BBMak - Sooner or Later 
 06. "I Can Tell" (written and produced with Pro J)

Ronan Keating - Ronan 
 05. "Keep On Walking" (written with Ronan Keating and Patrick Leonard)

2001

Mpress - Suddenly 
 01. "Maybe" (written with Tony Redic, Corron Cole, and Erica Dymakkus; produced with Corron Cole, and Steve "Rhythm" Clarke)
 07. "Over Me" (written with Bobby Keyes, Pro J (James Gass), and Corron Cole; produced with Pro J and Corron Cole)

2002

Prymary Colorz - If You Only Knew 
 03. "Say Goodbye" (written with Bobby Keyes, Corron Cole, Erica Dymakkus, James Gass, and Tony Redic)
 09. "If I Could Change" (written with Dan Hill; co-produced with Pro-J and Corron Cole)

Ruff Endz - Someone To Love You 
 12. "You Mean The World to Me" (written with Corey Rooney, and Dan Shea)

2003

Will Young - Friday's Child 
 07. "Very Kind" (written with Will Young, and Pro J (James Gass); Produced with Pro J)

2004

Usher - Confessions 
 14. "Can U Handle It?" (writer; produced with Pro J)

Raven-Symoné - This Is My Time 
 05. "Set Me Free" (written with Pro J (James Gass), Raven-Symoné, Sean Hurley; produced with Pro J)

Guy Sebastian - Beautiful Life 
 01. "Out With My Baby" (written with Guy Sebastian and Pro J (James Gass); produced with Pro J)
 09. "How" (writer; produced with Pro J)
 12. "Fiend For You" (written with Guy Sebastian, Robert Daniels, and Pro J (James Gass); produced with Pro J)

Michael Jackson - The Ultimate Collection 
 Disc 4, track 06. "Fall Again" (Demo)(previously unreleased) (written and produced with Walter Afanasieff)

2005

Will Young - Keep On 
 09. "Madness" (written with Will Young, Pro J (James Gass), Sean Hurley; Produced with Pro J)

Lil Wayne - Tha Carter II 
 16. "Shooter" (feat. Robin Thicke)
 Sample Credit: "Oh Shooter" by Robin Thicke
 Sample Credit: "Mass Appeal" by Gang Starr

Darin -  The Anthem 
 01. "Give It To Me" (written with Arnthor Birgisson)

2006

Mary J. Blige - Mary J. Blige & Friends
 02. "Ask Myself" (feat. Robin Thicke) (written with Bobby Keyes, Robert Daniels; Produced with Pro J)

Birdman & Lil Wayne - Like Father, Like Son 
 05. "Shooter" (feat. Robin Thicke) (Bonus Cd)
 Sample Credit: "Oh Shooter" by Robin Thicke
 Sample Credit: "Mass Appeal" by Gang Starr

2008

Lil Wayne - Tha Carter III 
 08. "Tie My Hands" (feat. Robin Thicke) (written with Dwayne Carter; producer)

Jennifer Hudson - Jennifer Hudson 
 04. "Giving Myself" (writer; Produced with Pro J)

References

External links
Robin Thicke at Discogs

American record producers
Hip hop discographies
Production discographies